Presidential elections were held in Taiwan on 14 January 2012. The election was held concurrently with legislative elections. It was the fifth direct election for the President of the Republic of China. Prior to 1996, the President was elected by the ROC's National Assembly and not directly by the people.

Incumbent Ma Ying-jeou was re-elected as President with 51.6% of the vote. DPP challenger Tsai Ing-wen resigned her post as chairperson of the DPP following her election defeat.

Background
The Kuomintang (KMT or Chinese Nationalist Party) ticket won a landslide victory in 2008 over the incumbent Democratic Progressive Party, with a 2.2 million vote margin on 58% of the valid votes.

The administration of Ma Ying-jeou has been friendlier in policy towards the People's Republic of China and also signed the Economic Cooperation Framework Agreement (ECFA), a preferential trade agreement between the governments of the PRC and the ROC.

The Democratic Progressive Party was hit hard with former president Chen Shui-bian's corruption revelations, but new chairwoman Tsai Ing-wen rebuilt the party, leading to a series of victories in legislative by-elections and local elections.
	
One big election topic appears to be the "1992 consensus", a term describing the declared outcome of a meeting in 1992 between the semi-official representatives of mainland China and Taiwan. The KMT agrees that this consensus should be the basis for negotiations with the PRC and supports it during the election, while the DPP believes that no such consensus was reached and that as a policy it is equivalent to the One-China principle, which the DPP opposes. Instead, the DPP has advocated that a "Taiwan consensus" be produced in a democratic way, by the legislature and a referendum of the people of Taiwan.

Candidates
As determined by a random draw, the DPP's Tsai-Su ticket was listed first on Election Day ballots; the incumbent KMT's Ma-Wu ticket was listed second; and the People First Party (PFP)'s Soong-Lin ticket, third.

Democratic Progressive Party

Incumbent chairperson Tsai Ing-wen was the DPP nominee. She was designated the party’s candidate in April 2011 following a primary by opinion polls. Candidates for the DPP primary were Tsai, former premier Su Tseng-chang and former chairman Hsu Hsin-liang. Former Vice President Annette Lu Hsiu-lien announced her intention to run but withdrew. On 9 September 2012 candidate Tsai chose DPP secretary-general Su Jia-chyuan as her running mate.

Democratic Progressive nominees

Democratic Progressive candidates

Kuomintang
Incumbent President Ma Ying-jeou was standing for re-election. There were no challengers within the party, so no primary was necessary.

Vice President Vincent Siew chose not to run for a second term, and on 19 June 2011 President Ma selected Premier Wu Den-yih as his running mate.

Ma's campaign was run by King Pu-tsung, a former party Secretary-General.

Kuomintang nominees

People First Party
PFP chairman James Soong Chu-yu launched the party's first-ever Presidential bid on 20 September 2011. Soong stated, however, that his candidacy was contingent on the success of a nationwide signature drive, organized by Kao Tsu-min and Yang Fu-mei. He vowed to run and keep his candidacy active through the election if his campaign garnered one million signatures throughout Taiwan.

Soong chose National Taiwan University professor emeritus Lin Ruey-shiung, a career scientist and academic with no political experience, to be his running mate.

Soong contended that the Taiwanese people desire a third choice outside the two main parties (KMT and DPP), despite concerns that his decision may split the Pan-Blue coalition vote to hand victory to the Pan-Green candidate as may have happened in the 2000 Presidential election.

People First nominees

Opinion polls

After initially trailing, Ma started to pick up the lead, without Soong as a candidate, after September, 2011 in most opinion polls. However, Tsai benefited from the debates in the later stages.

Results

Voting took place between 8:00 and 16:00 local time at 14,806 polling stations. After Ma's re-election, he announced that his victory had vindicated his policies in regards to cross-strait relations. Tsai conceded the election and resigned from her position as head of the DPP. Turnout was reported to be over 74%.

Ma Ying-jeou and Wu Den-yih were inaugurated as the President and Vice President of Taiwan respectively at the Presidential Office Building on 20 May 2012.

Maps

Reactions
 – The State Council's Taiwan Affairs Office stated Ma's reelection proved the developments in cross-strait relations during his term is "the correct path that has won the support of the majority of the Taiwanese compatriots."
  – Chief Executive candidate Henry Tang said the result reflects that Taiwanese people approve Ma's cross-strait policies, and expressed his wishes for peaceful and stable situation for economic development.
 – Even before the confirmation of the result, the Ministry of Foreign Affairs issued a statement congratulating Ma saying: "Singapore and Taiwan enjoy a close and friendly relationship which goes back many years [and that] they will continue to strengthen this relationship based on Singapore's "One China" policy." It added by wishing "all the parties success in working towards greater peace and prosperity,  and securing the well-being of the future generations."
 – The White House issued a statement congratulating Ma and added it congratulates "the people of Taiwan on the successful conduct of their presidential and legislative elections;" also adding: "We hope the impressive efforts that both sides have undertaken in recent years to build cross-strait ties continue."

References

External links
2012 Presidential Election Press Kit, Government Information Office, Executive Yuan

Candidate information
Ma Ying-jeou
Tsai Ing-wen
Su Tseng-chang
Annette Lu Hsiu-lien

Taiwan
Presidential
Presidential elections in Taiwan
January 2012 events in Asia